Alfredo Müller (June 30, 1869 – February 7, 1939) was a Franco-Italian painter and printmaker of Swiss nationality.
As a painter from Livorno, he might have belonged to the group of the Postmacchiaioli, together with Mario Puccini, Oscar Ghiglia, Plinio Nomellini, Ulvi Liegi, Giovanni Bartolena, and others, but he is a disciple of the Florentine portraitist Michele Gordigiani. As a French engraver, he was close to Francis Jourdain, Manuel Robbe, Richard Ranft, Eugène Delâtre, Théophile Steinlen.

Biography 

Müller was born in Livorno to a wealthy Swiss family involved in the international cotton and coffee trades. At the age of 15, he began studying art in Florence with the masters Giuseppe Ciaranfi and Michele Gordigiani of the Academy of Fine Arts. There he became friends for life with Edoardo Gordigiani, the son of Michele, and Egisto Fabbri, a Tuscan-American.

In 1886, as a young painter, he participated in the First Exhibition of Fine Arts of Livorno, together with established painters such as Giovanni Fattori and Silvestro Lega.

In 1889, he exhibited two of his paintings at the Universal Exhibition in Paris, where he discovered Impressionism. This moment represented a turning point in the career of the young painter, as he was always concerned with colors and vibrations of light. After his return to Tuscany, his paintings, which now reflected the influence of Impressionism, sparked debate for their overly French character.

At the same moment, the failure of the Bank of Livorno provoked the ruin of his father's house, and a few years later Müller emigrated to Paris, eventually settling in Montmartre. He made friends in the social circle of artists, writers and musicians, becoming acquainted in particular with Renoir, but also with Pissarro and Cézanne, whom he considered his master, and became a well-known etcher in colours. Among his Italian friends in Paris, we find his relative Leonetto Cappiello and Libero Andreotti.

In 1914, he was in Rome with Marguerite, whom he married in 1908. In Rome he exhibited 12 paintings at the Second Secession. Because of the war, he moved to Florence initially for a short while but he ended up staying for 18 years. The couple found a little house in the hills overlooking Florence, at Settignano. Müller painted frequently, always working on the movement of light. A great part of his work in this period was dedicated to decorative arts, in which he could express his fascination for theater and its magic. After the political situation worsened, he returned to France in 1932 where he spent his last years. He died in Paris in 1939.

He is the elder brother of the cycling champion Rodolfo Müller, who ran the first Tour de France  (arrived 4th) and the brother in law of the American cycling-champion and pace-maker Gus Lawson who married his younger sister Marie. He descends from Lewis Evans (surveyor), geographer and close friend of Benjamin Franklin, whose daughter Amelia (Philadelphia 1744- Hythe (Southampton, 1835), married to the Irish sea Captain David Barry, was the great-grandmother of Alfredo's grandfather Charles Eugène Schintz, surgeon in Livorno.

Alfredo Müller. Sur papier. Su carta. On Paper, Complete Catalogue of the Graphic Work has been published end of 2014 by Les Amis d'Alfredo Müller. Based on wide researches, this large publication lets for the first time overview the life of the artist and the coherence of his art. It gives complete notes for more than two hundred engravings all created in Paris between 1896 and 1906 and about one hundred drawings. The Complete Catalogue of the Painted Work is in preparation.

References
Alfredo Müller. Opera grafica, catalogo della mostra a cura di Mario Quesada, con la collaborazione di Elisabetta Matucci e una testimonianza di Giuseppe Sprovieri, Livorno, Museo di Villa Maria, August – October 1982.
Alfredo Müller 1869–1939, Color Etchings and Aquatints, Essay by Mario Quesada and an Introduction by Elisabetta Matucci, Houston, Gerhard Wurzer Gallery, February – March 1988.
Alfredo Müller 1869–1939, Color Etchings and Aquatints, Houston, Gerhard Wurzer Gallery, September 1992.
From Pissarro to Picasso. Color Etching in France. Works from the Bibliothèque nationale and the Zimmerli Museum, Phillip Dennis Cate & Marianne Grivel (ed.), Rutgers, N.J., Amsterdam & Paris, 1992–1993.
Francesca Cagianelli (a cura di), Alfredo Müller, Un ineffabile dandy dell'impressionismo, Firenze, Polistampa 2011.
Emanuele Bardazzi, Hélène Koehl, Le peintre et graveur Alfredo Müller, un maître méconnu de l'eau-forte en couleurs à la Belle Epoque, in "Nouvelles de l'estampe" n. 233–234, Paris, Comité national de la Gravure française - BnF, March 2011, p. 18–32.
 Patrick-Gilles Persin, Alfredo Müller, une heureuse redécouverte, in "Nouvelles de l'estampe" n. 237, Winter 2011–2012, p. 73-74.
 Hélène Koehl, Alfredo Müller incisore de ‘La vie heureuse de Dante Alighieri’ nella Parigi della Belle Epoque, in "Grafica d’Arte" n. 89, January - March 2012, p. 18-23.
 Hélène Koehl et Emanuele Bardazzi, Alfredo Müller Lithographe/Litografo, préface de Mireille Romand, textes bilingues français et italien, notices complètes des lithographies de l'artiste, Paris-Strasbourg, Les Amis d'Alfredo Müller éditeur, 2012.
 Hélène Koehl, Dix eaux-fortes d’Alfredo Müller acquises par la BnF. Où il est question d’E. Delâtre, d’A. Vollard et d’E. Sagot, in "Nouvelles de l'estampe" n. 243, Summer 2013, p. 40-44.
 Hélène Koehl, Alfredo Müller, in "Impressions à Montmartre : Eugène Delâtre & Alfredo Müller", catalogue de l’exposition au Musée de Montmartre, 14 septembre 2013-12 janvier 2014, Milano, Silvana Editoriale 2013, p. 39-49
 Hélène Koehl, Alfredo Müller, un Livournais à Montmartre avant Modigliani (1896-1914), "Le Vieux Montmartre", 127ème année, nouvelle série n. 83, December 2013, p. 21-29
 Hélène Koehl, Alfredo Müller. Sur papier. Su carta. On Paper. Catalogue raisonné trilingue de l'oeuvre graphique. Avec des contributions d'Emanuele Bardazzi, Céline Chicha-Castex, Elisabetta Matucci, Nicolas Romand, Sarah Sauvin et une présentation de Rémi Mathis, Paris-Strasbourg, Les Amis d'Alfredo Müller éditeur, November 2014.

External links

Müller Expo at Sagot - Le Garrec, Paris, 2015
Müller Expo in Livorno Feb 26-Apr 25, 2011
Nouvelles de l'Estampe n. 233-234, Paris, 2011
Alfredo Müller at Studio d'Arte dell'Ottocento, Livorno
Diverse catalogues (entry: Alfred o Alfredo Muller) at the Frick Art Reference Library

1869 births
1939 deaths
People from Livorno
French etchers
19th-century Italian painters
Italian male painters
20th-century Italian painters
Painters from Tuscany
20th-century French printmakers
19th-century Italian male artists
20th-century Italian male artists